Digital signage is a segment of electronic signage. Digital displays use technologies such as LCD, LED, projection and e-paper to display digital images, video, web pages, weather data, restaurant menus, or text. They can be found in public spaces, transportation systems, museums, stadiums, retail stores, hotels, restaurants and corporate buildings etc., to provide wayfinding, exhibitions, marketing and outdoor advertising. They are used as a network of electronic displays that are centrally managed and individually addressable for the display of text, animated or video messages for advertising, information, entertainment and merchandising to targeted audiences.

Roles and function 
The many different uses of digital signage allow a business to accomplish a variety of goals. Some of the most common applications include:

Public information – news, weather, traffic and local (location specific) information, such as building directory with a map, fire exits and traveler information.
Internal information - corporate messages, such as health & safety items, news and so forth.
Product information – pricing, photos, raw materials or ingredients, suggested applications and other product information - especially useful in food marketing where signage may include nutritional facts or suggested uses or recipes.
Information to enhance the customer service experience - interpretive signage in museums, galleries, zoos, parks and gardens, exhibitions, tourist and cultural attractions.
Advertising and Promotion – promoting products or services, may be related to the location of the sign or using the screen's audience reach for general advertising.
Brand building – in-store digital sign to promote the brand and build a brand identity.
Influencing customer behavior – navigation, directing customers to different areas, increasing the "dwell time" on the store premises and a wide range of other uses in service of such influence.
Influencing product or brand decision-making - Signage at the point of sale designed to influence choice e.g. Signage to help shoppers to choose dresses inside a fashion store or devices that on a computerized shopping trolley helping the customer locate products, check prices, access product information and manage shopping lists.
Enhancing customer experience – applications include the reduction of perceived wait time in the waiting areas of restaurants and other retail operations, bank queues, and similar circumstances, as well as demonstrations, such as those of recipes in food stores, among other examples.
Navigation – with interactive screens (in the floor, for example, as with "informational footsteps" found in some tourist attractions, museums and the like) or with other means of "dynamic wayfinding".
Reservations – small, interactive screens on walls or desks that allow employees to reserve the space for a limited time and integrate with a room and resource scheduling platform.

Industry overview 

Over 200 different companies worldwide market digital signage solutions and the number is still consistently growing. With the influx of digital signage providers, the digital signage market will increase at a compounded annual growth rate of 7.5% between 2021 and 2028. The reason for the rise is due to the growing demand by companies for the development of digital signage solutions, advertisement displays and paper wastage reduction, along with the growing awareness of the benefits of digital signage. As of 2021, North America dominates the digital signage market with a revenue share of 34.5%. The U.S., U.K., and Germany are projected to have considerable digital signage growth. The predominant market users of digital signage are restaurants, retailers, office buildings, regional state and local planning authorities, public transport services, and various different industries.

Restaurants 

Digital signage is used in restaurants through an interactive menu screen that rotates promotional offers. Restaurants use digital signage both indoors and outdoors, with the latter needing a form of weather protection depending on the components of the hardware. Outdoor usage of digital signage is most prevalent in drive-through that allows the customer to browse through the entire menu at a glance while also placing their order with an interactive touchscreen. Indoor digital signage is used for the display of menus. Prior to the integration of digital signage, restaurants manually updated the cafeteria menu, which is in itself a full-time job, especially if the menu is updated daily. With digital signage, restaurants do not have to manually update the menu feed, with live menu feed from digital signage solutions. According to a survey conducted by quick-service restaurants and casual restaurant operators, over 20% of restaurant operators experience a 5% sales lift after incorporating digital signage in their service sectors.

Shopping malls 

Digital signage is widely used in shopping malls as a form of directory or map display. Uses of digital signage include a wayfinding kiosk, enabling the customer to find their path through an interactive touchscreen. Recent digital signage have begun combining interactive advertisement with wayfinding application. This will offer shoppers who interact with the advertisement of the tenant in the shopping mall to the store. Another usage is disseminating relevant information such as the schedule of an event or campaign.

Hospitality 

The hospitality industry uses digital signage to display crucial information at a convenient and visible location for all its patron. A digital signage is capable of functioning as a virtual concierge in hotels and as entertainment for conferences during waiting room. Digital signage is also used in hotels as a form of wayfinding, to guide a large group of people for a conference to the correct room. Digital signage is used to provide a simple method to update information that is continuously changing such as expo information.

Cinema 

Digital signage is placed in the lobby, concession stands and displays advertisement before the movie begins. This informs customers about other theater offerings and scheduling, increasing concession sales and gaining other sources of revenue.

Transport  

Transport is a growing sector for digital signage with practical solutions, such as wayfinding, as well as out-of-home advertising.

Personalized digital content
One specific use of digital signage is for out-of-home advertising in which video content, advertisements, and/or messages are displayed on digital signs with the goal of delivering targeted messages, to specific locations and/or consumers, at specific times. This is often called "digital out of home" (DOOH).

Education 
Digital signage can be used for school cafeteria menu boards, digitized noticeboards, and as an element of smart campuses. The University of Minnesota has installed 300 digital signage boards, updated with real-time data.

Technologies

Interactivity
Interactive digital signage allows end users to interact with digital content via touchscreens, body sensors or QR codes via smartphones.

Digital signs can interact with mobile phones using SMS messaging and Bluetooth. SMS can be used to post messages on the displays, while Bluetooth allows users to interact directly with what they see on screen. In addition to mobile interactivity, networks are also using technology that integrates social and location-based media interactivity. This technology enables end users to upload photos and messages to social networks as well as text messages.

The widespread use of smartphones led to the development of screen–smart device interaction technologies. These allow smartphone users to interact directly with the digital signage screen, for example, participate in a poll, play a game, or share social network content. JPEG images and MPEG4 videos remain the dominant digital content formats for the digital signage industry. For interactive content, HTML5 and Unity3D are widely used due to their popularity among web developers and multimedia designers.

Context-aware digital signage
Context-aware digital signage leverages technologies such as sensors, cameras, beacons, RFID technologies, software programs and network connectivity including the Internet of Things (IoT) to monitor the ambient environment, process information and deliver promotional messages based on environmental cues. Many digital signage products include cameras and gather shopper demographic data by estimating the age, gender and economic status of passers-by and use this information to update signage as well as to provide back-end analytics and shopper profiles.

Equipment and network infrastructure

Digital signs rely on a variety of hardware to deliver the content. The components of a typical digital sign installation include one or more display screens, one or more media players, and a content management server. Sometimes two or more of these components are present in a single device but typically there is a display screen, a media player, and a content management server that is connected to the media player over a network. One content management server may support multiple media players and one media player may support multiple screens. Stand-alone digital sign devices combine all three functions in one device and no network connection is needed. Digital signage media players run on a variety of operating systems including Windows, Linux, Android and iOS.

LCD and LED displays 

Rapidly dropping prices for large plasma and LCD screens have led to a growing increase in the number of digital sign installations. An array of these displays is known as a video wall. With the release of the HDMI 2.1 standard in 2017, wall resolution can reach 4K at higher refresh rates, 8K displays, up to 10K in some applications.

Digital signage displays use content management systems and digital media distribution systems which can either be run from personal computers and servers or regional/national media hosting providers. In many digital sign applications, content must be regularly updated to ensure that the correct messages are being displayed. This can either be done manually as and when needed, through a scheduling system, using a data feed from a content provider (e.g. Canadian Press, Data Call Technologies, Bloomberg LP, Thomson Reuters, AHN), or an in-house data source.

Whenever the display, media player and content server are located apart there is a need for audio-video wiring between the display and the media player and between the media player and the content server. The connection from media player to display is normally a VGA, DVI, HDMI or Component video connection. Sometimes this signal is distributed over Cat 5 cables using transmitter and receiver baluns allowing for greater distances between display and player and simplified wiring. The connection from media player to the content server is usually a wired Ethernet connection although some installations use wireless Wi-Fi networking.

Usage reporting 
Some digital signage with the ability to offer interactive media content will come with a usage reporting function. Each interaction users have made with the digital signage such as the photos that were taken, the number of games that were played will be recorded in the digital signage and produced in the form of a usage report. From the report, owners of the digital signage will be able to gauge the effectiveness of the particular advertisement or media content that was in play at the specific hour based on the number of times interaction has been made. Furthermore, if the digital signage is integrated with kinect, the signage will be able to determine the proximity of the consumer to the display and their demographic details such as age, gender for further analytic and consumer behavior study.

History 
Digital content is managed via display control software. This control software can be a stand-alone dedicated program or integrated with hardware. New messages can be created from an inventory of audio, video, image, graphics, words and phrases which are assembled in different combinations and permutations to yield new messages in real-time.
Digital content displayed on the signage is presented in one of the following formats:

 Text - Scrolling text. Either scrolling text, or text dynamically updated via external Newsfeed source.
 Images - Scrolling images, usually in the format of digital advertisement posters
 Video - many display control systems use canned graphics and video, however, custom video can be self-generated or contracted by many sources.
 Interactive interfaces - Integration of signage with a touch screen, beacons, sensors, RFID technologies, to allow for two-way communications with the users. Interactive digital signage helps to engage users and may also assist advertisers to gain insight into customer behavior.
 Context-aware interfaces - Integration of signage with cameras, sensors and software to monitor the ambient environment and audience, allowing signage to be updated according to the audience profile, weather conditions or some other relevant external factor.

Predecessors to electronic signage 
Prior to the advent of digital signage throughout the industries, electronic paper were used as display devices. Electronic paper were used to hold static texts and images indefinitely without electricity. The disadvantage to electronic paper as a form of digital signage is the limited reach of information transmission. Users that need to update the information will need to be in the same retail store, or be within the proximity for shopping malls. This required manual work from store staffs and shopping mall staff in maintaining the device with the latest information.

First generation: Dot matrix display 
First generation of digital signage display utilize LED board, projection screens or other emerging display types like interactive surfaces or organic LED screens (OLED). A dot matrix display digital signage will relay the information within a database. All the information must be inputted manually by a person before the message display is updated. This form of digital signage is most commonly used in both train stations, airports, and other areas where information must be conveyed to the mass public. The downside of having dot matrix digital signage is the lack of media player. This digital signage will not be able to play multimedia contents.

Second generation: Multimedia player digital signage 
The second generation of digital signage is able to play multimedia contents and is controlled by a centralized management system. Digital audiovisual (av) content is reproduced on TVs and monitor displays of a digital sign network from at least one media player (usually a small computer unit, but DVD players and other types of media sources may also be used). Various hardware and software options exist. These range from portable media players that can output JPG slide shows or loops of MPEG-2 video to networks consisting of multiple players and servers that offer control over enterprise-wide or campus-wide displays at many venues from a single location. The former are ideal for small groups of displays that can be updated via USB flash drive, SD card or CD-ROM. Another option is the use of D.A.N. (Digital Advertising Network) players that connect directly to the monitor and to the internet, to a WAN (Wide Area Network), or to a LAN (Local Area Network). This allows the end user the ability to manage multiple D.A.N. players from any location. The end user can create new advertising or edit existing advertisements and then upload changes to the D.A.N. via the internet or other networking options.

APIs for some digital sign software allow customized content management interfaces through which end-users can manage their content from one location.

More advanced digital sign software allows content to be automatically created by the media players (computers) and servers on a minute-by-minute basis, combining real-time data, from news to weather, prices, transport schedules, etc., with av content to produce the most up-to-date content.

Third generation: Interactive digital signage 
The current generation of digital signage builds onto the previous generation with the added function to interact with the system. Users will be able to interact with the advertisement, scroll through the product menu, or share their information online via the new generation of digital signage. The interactive digital signage opens up interaction and ability to collect more personalize information. Some common uses of interactive digital signage are for users to take a picture and then connect to their Facebook, Twitter, Instagram, or other Social media platform to share the photo they have taken.

See also 

 Electronic signage
 Emergency communication system
 Kiosk software
 Out-of-home advertising
 Retail media
 Signage

References

External links

Advertising tools
Signage
Video
Digital media
Articles containing video clips